Gilbert Bellone (born 27 December 1942 in Grasse) was a French professional road bicycle racer.

Major results

1962
Grasse
1965
Saint-Vallier
1966
Guéret
Prix de Saint-Céré
Chateauneuf
Saint-Claud
1967
Toulon
Vuelta a España:
Winner stage 8
1968
Vailly-sur-Sauldre
Maurs
Ronde de Seignelay
Tour de France:
Winner stage 10
1969
Critérium International
GP de Cannes
Guingamp
1972
Bain-de-Bretagne
Rund um den Henninger-Turm
1973
Auray

External links 

French male cyclists
1942 births
Living people
French Tour de France stage winners
French Vuelta a España stage winners
Sportspeople from Alpes-Maritimes
People from Grasse
Cyclists from Provence-Alpes-Côte d'Azur